Le ragioni del cuore ("The reasons of the heart") is a 2002 Italian romantic comedy mini series directed by Luca Manfredi, Anna Di Francisca and Alberto Simone. It was broadcast on Rai Uno. It consists of six episodes, each having a budget of about 1 billion and 800 million lire. Every episode has a special guest-star (Nino Manfredi, Alessandro Benvenuti, Nando Gazzolo, Gioele Dix, Francesco Paolantoni, Rodolfo Laganà).

Main cast

Irene Ferri as Andreina Ciccone
Sabrina Impacciatore  as Rosamaria Ciccone
Luigi Diberti  as Oreste Ciccone
Fioretta Mari as  Giovanna
Pietro De Silva as Salvatore
Paola Minaccioni as Malva
Fabio Traversa as   Manlio
Massimo Reale as Pietro
Sonia Gessner as  Eleonora
Thomas Trabacchi as Morandi
David Sebasti as Antonio Marullo
Cinzia Mascoli 
Tiziana Lodato

References

External links
 

2002 television films
2002 films
2000s Italian-language films
Italian television films